Kuta is a handmade cloth many Eritrean and Ethiopian men use to cover their head and shoulders when they wear clothing made out of chiffon, especially when attending church. It is made up of two layers of fabric, unlike gabi which is made out of four. Netela or netsela is the female version.

References 

Eritrean clothing
Ethiopian clothing